Psenuc solitarius is a jumping spider species in the genus Psenuc that lives in Namibia and South Africa. The species was previously allocated to the genus Pseudicius. The female was first described in 2011.

References

Salticidae
Fauna of Namibia
Spiders described in 2011
Spiders of Africa
Taxa named by Wanda Wesołowska